Kursath may refer to:

 Kursath, Hardoi, town in Hardoi district in the Indian state of Uttar Pradesh
 Kursath, Unnao, town in Unnao district in the Indian state of Uttar Pradesh